Rhodium(IV) fluoride is a chemical compound of rhodium and fluorine. It is formed when rhodium(III) bromide reacts with bromine trifluoride. Iridium(IV) fluoride, palladium(IV) fluoride and platinum(IV) fluoride have the same crystal structure.

References

Rhodium compounds
Fluorides
Platinum group halides